Jean-Luc Loret (born 2 February 1944) is a French former sports shooter. He competed in the 50 metre rifle, prone event at the 1968 Summer Olympics.

References

1944 births
Living people
French male sport shooters
Olympic shooters of France
Shooters at the 1968 Summer Olympics